The 39th Annual Tony Awards was broadcast by CBS television on June 2, 1985, from the Shubert Theatre. Instead of a formal host, there was a group of performers/presenters. Some paid tribute to the songs of Jule Styne, Cy Coleman, Andrew Lloyd Webber, with these composers ending the broadcast by playing songs from their respective new shows. Mary Martin introduced the Special Award for Yul Brynner.

The ceremony
For the first time in the history of the Tonys, awards were not presented for Best Performance by a Leading Actor in a Musical, Best Performance by a Leading Actress in a Musical, or Best Choreography. 
According to The New York Times, "Theater historians and Tony administrators say they cannot recall an instance when one category was dropped from the awards, much less three." According to the Associated Press, "The award for best actress, musical was eliminated this season because there was only one eligible candidate," and "The nominating committee declined to give nominations [in those categories] because they did not consider any of the performances or choreography outstanding or excellent."

Musicals represented:

 Big River ("Muddy Water"/" River in the Rain"- Daniel Jenkins, Ron Richardson and Company)
 Grind ("This Must Be the Place" - Ben Vereen and Company)
 Leader of the Pack ("I Wanna Love Him So Bad/Do Wah Diddy" - Company)

Presenters and Performers: Danny Aiello, Susan Anton, Hinton Battle, Deborah Bauers, Deborah Burrell, Terry Burrell, Jim Dale, Loretta Devine, Jackie Gleason, Julie Harris, Rex Harrison, George Hearn, Van Johnson, Raul Julia, Rosetta LeNoire, Mary Martin, Millicent Martin, Maureen McGovern, Rita Moreno, Mike Nichols, Stefanie Powers, Juliet Prowse, Tony Randall, Lee Roy Reams, Lynn Redgrave, Chita Rivera, Wanda Richert, Tony Roberts, Rex Smith, Leslie Uggams, Dick Van Dyke, Ben Vereen, Tom Wopat

Winners and nominees
Winners are in bold

Source: InfoPlease

Special awards
 Regional Theatre Award - Steppenwolf Theatre Company, Chicago, Illinois
 Yul Brynner honoring his 4,525 performances in The King and I
New York State Council on the Arts

Multiple nominations and awards

These productions had multiple nominations:

10 nominations: Big River 
7 nominations: Grind and Much Ado About Nothing   
6 nominations: Quilters and Strange Interlude
4 nominations: A Day in the Death of Joe Egg and Hurlyburly 
3 nominations: As Is, Biloxi Blues, Cyrano de Bergerac, The King and I and Ma Rainey's Black Bottom 

The following productions received multiple awards.

7 wins: Big River 
3 wins: Biloxi Blues
2 wins: A Day in the Death of Joe Egg and Grind

See also
 Drama Desk Awards
 1985 Laurence Olivier Awards – equivalent awards for West End theatre productions
 Obie Award
 New York Drama Critics' Circle
 Theatre World Award
 Lucille Lortel Awards

References

External links
Tony Awards official site

Tony Awards ceremonies
1985 in theatre
1985 theatre awards
Tony
1985 in New York City